Antonio Machado is a station on Line 7 of the Madrid Metro. It is located in fare Zone A.  This station close to the street of the same name, in the Valdezarza neighborhood (Moncloa-Aravaca district). It also serves the Peñagrande neighborhood (Fuencarral-El Pardo district). The station opened to the public on 29 March 1999.

References 

Line 7 (Madrid Metro) stations
Railway stations in Spain opened in 1999